Barbara Zoeke is a German writer. She grew up in Vogtland in Thuringia. She trained as a psychologist, has conducted research in the United States, and for many years was on the board of the International Society for Comparative Psychology. She researches and teaches at the universities of Münster, Frankfurt, Würzburg and Munich. In addition to her scholarly work, she publishes narrative prose, poetry and non-fiction. Zoeke lives in Berlin since 2008.

Works
Her books include:
 
 
  (winner of the Brothers Grimm Prize of the City of Hanau, 2017)

Dissertation

References

Living people
German women writers
Year of birth missing (living people)